Rachel Hassler (born 22 May 1995 in Albuquerque, New Mexico, United States), is an American women's International motorcycle trials rider. Hassler is a three time NATC Women's Trials Champion and member of the American Trial Des Nations team.

Biography
Rachel first competed in the NATC Women's national series in 2010, scoring in all rounds and finishing the season in a creditable 4th place.

In 2011, she went one better, ending the season in 3rd place behind Caroline Allen and Colorado rider Sarah Duke.

The 2012 season started well for Hassler, a pair of wins at the opening two rounds in California set her up for a good season. Rounds 3 and 4 didn't go quite as planned but the title chase was back on track following a 2nd place and a win in Ohio. The final two rounds in Rhode Island saw Rachel take another win and a runner up place to bag her first NATC Women's Title ahead of Caroline Allen. Hassler joined Allen and Louise Forsley in the American TDN team and competed in Switzerland finishing in 5th place.

After a move up to the newly added NATC Women's Expert Sportsman class, Rachel ended the 2013 season in runner-up spot behind Allen. She again competed in the Trial Des Nations event alongside Allen and Caroline Altman, this time the team finished in 7th place in France.

2014 was a clean sweep for Hassler after she won all 8 rounds of the NATC Women's ES championship and took her second national title. This year the TDN was held in Andorra and the American team consisted of Hassler, Duke and Madeline Hoover. They put in a good performance and finished in 8th place.

After the series was split into East and West for the 2015 season, a repeat performance saw Hassler win the NATC West title ahead of TDN teammate Hoover, with Caroline Altman finishing in 3rd. Hassler finished 3rd in the East series with Hoover taking the title. At the Trial Des Nations held in Spain the US team of Hassler, Hoover and Allen finished 7th.

National Trials Championship Career

Honors
 US National NATC Women's Trials Champion 2012, 2014
 US National NATC Western Women's Champion 2017
 US National NATC Western Women's Expert Sportswoman Champion 2015
 US National NATC Eastern Women's Expert Sportswoman Champion 2016

Related Reading
NATC Trials Championship
FIM Trial European Championship
FIM Trial World Championship

References 

1995 births
Living people
American sportswomen
American motorcycle racers
Motorcycle trials riders
21st-century American women